Rowan County Senior High School (RCSHS) is located in Morehead, Kentucky, United States. The enrollment in the 201819 school year was 890 students. The mascot is the Viking and the school colors are green and white. Brandy Carver is the current principal.

Basketball
In 2011, the boys' basketball team played in the championship game of the 2011 PNC Bank/Kentucky High School Athletic Association Boys' Sweet Sixteen Basketball Tournament. Although the Rowan Vikings lost the game in double overtime, a resolution was created by the Senate of the General Assembly of the Commonwealth of Kentucky to honor the team, their coach, their school and their community for their efforts in "one of the best high school basketball games this Commonwealth has ever seen."

Forensic team (speech and debate)
Since the mid-1980s, the Rowan County Senior High School forensic program has been a power house team in Kentucky speech and debate competition. The team has won twenty-four Kentucky Educational Speech and Drama Association (KESDA) overall team championships since 1989, a number unrivaled by any other school in Kentucky. In 2012, the team began competing at the Kentucky High School Speech League (KHSSL) State championship after a 23-year hiatus from the tournament. The team has now won the KHSSL State title four times in eight years. In addition to this, the team has captured hundreds of individual student awards, team sweepstakes trophies, and produced countless individual state champions. For their success and service to the Kentucky forensic community, former head coaches Mark and Virginia Etherton were inducted to the KHSSL Hall of Fame in 2010 and 2012, respectively.

The Rowan County team also competes on the national level and has been recognized for excellence. The team is a charter school of the National Speech and Debate Association (formerly the NFL) and competes in the Association's district and national tournaments each year. The team has produced three national finalists. In 1999 and 2015 the team was presented with a School of Excellence award for being among the top teams at the national tournament. They are one of two schools in Kentucky to have received this award more than once. The Rowan County team has qualified students to attend the national tournament every year since 1988 with the first national qualifier in 1986.

Team state titles:

KESDA: 1989, 1990, 1991, 1992, 1993, 1994, 1995, 1996, 1997, 1998, 1999, 2000, 2001, 2002, 2003, 2004, 2005, 2006, 2007, 2009, 2013, 2014, 2019, 2020, 2021

KHSSL: 2013, 2014, 2015, 2020, 2021, 2022

Notable alumni
Matt Cutts - Director of engineering for the United States Digital Service, former head of the web spam team at Google
Sam Holbrook - MLB umpire
Joe Magrane - MLB player

References

Public high schools in Kentucky
Schools in Rowan County, Kentucky